The Wacken Worship is the first video album by German power metal band Powerwolf. The album contains live footage of their show at Wacken Open Air on 2 August 2008.

It was also released as a bonus DVD for the limited edition of their third studio album Bible of the Beast in 2009, and in 2014 on the box set The History of Heresy I.

It also contained a video "Impressions from the Europe in Bloodred Tour 2005".

Track listing

Personnel 

 Attila Dorn – vocals
 Matthew Greywolf – lead guitar
 Charles Greywolf – rhythm guitar
 Stéfane Funèbre – drums, percussion
 Falk Maria Schlegel – keyboards
 Ronald Matthes – director
 Ronald Matthes – executive producer
 Marcel Schleiff – executive producer
 Rodrigo Diaz – film editor
 Marianne Baar – production leader
 Jacky Lehmann – audio recording
 Robin Stirnberg – sound engineer
 Matthias Wendt – audio recording engineer
 Marcus Dattilo – crane operator
 Ludwig Götze – camera operator
 Kaja Kargus – camera operator
 Stefan Koch – camera operator
 Krischan Kriesten – lighting director
 Jan-Paul Wass – camera operator
 Rodrigo Diaz – color correction
 Stefan Ost – live editor
 Jochen Schaaf – live editor
 James Boyle – stage manager
 Thomas Grummt – DVD authoring
 Norbert Kuntz – production leader on site

References 

Powerwolf live albums
2008 video albums
Live video albums